This is a list of programs produced by Banijay containing shows from several different divisions all over the world, including North America, Australia, the United Kingdom and its divisions of past and present among others.

Banijay Americas

Banijay Studios North America

Endemol Shine North America

Endemol USA

Shine America

Original Media

Endemol Shine Studios

51 Minds Entertainment

Mindless Entertainment

Truly Original

True Entertainment

Zodiak USA

RDF USA

Authentic Entertainment

Bunim/Murray Productions

Stephen David Entertainment

Banijay UK

Bandit Television

Dragonfly

Kudos

The Comedy Unit

Douglas Road Productions

Bwark Productions

Lucky Day Productions

Red House Television

IWC Media

Sharp Jack TV

Electric Robin

The Natural Studios

Wonder

Mam Tor Productions

Tiger Aspect Productions

Shiny Button Productions

Definitely

Radar

History Television International

Diverse Productions

Sidney Street

Fearless Minds

Tigress Productions

Workerbee TV

RDF Television

Fizz

Bullseye Television

Endemol UK Productions

Presentable

Artists Studio

OP Talent

Castaway Television Productions

Darlow Smithson Productions

Shine TV

Initial

Dangerous Films

Remarkable Television

Blacklight Television

Cheetah Television

Zodiak Media Ireland

Brighter Pictures

Fifty Fathoms

Zeppotron

Banijay Australia and New Zealand

Screentime

Endemol Shine Australia

Endemol Australia

Beyond International

Endemol Shine Turkey

Kuarzo Endemol Shine Group Argentina

Banijay format

Zodiak Kids Studios

Marathon Media

Tele Images Kids

The Foundation

Banijay Benelux

Endemol Shine Nederland

Banijay Germany

Brainpool TV

Endemol Shine Germany

Banijay France

Adventure Line Productions

Terence Films

Endemol France

Banijay Productions France

Television movies and specials

Banijay UK

Darlow Smithson Productions
 The Last Dragon (2004)
 9/11: The Falling Man (2006)
 Deep Water (2006)
 The Sinking of the Lusitania: Terror at Sea (2007)
 Clapham Junction (2007)
 Children of 9/11 (2011)
 MegaQuake: Hour That Shook Japan (2011)
 Tornado Rampage 2011 (2011)
 How the Bismarck Sank HMS Hood (2012)
 Richard III: The Unseen Story (2013)
 Hawking (2013)
 Dave Allen at Peace (2018)
 Agatha and the Truth of Murder (2018)
 Torvill & Dean (2018)
 Agatha and the Curse of Ishtar (2019)
 Agatha and the Midnight Murders (2020)

Tiger Aspect Productions
 Sherlock Holmes and the Case of the Silk Stocking (2004)
 Coming Down the Mountain (2007)
 White Girl (2008)
 Marvellous (2014) (co-production with Fifty Fathoms)
 Jack Whitehall at Large (2017)
 Murder on the Blackpool Express (2017) (co-production with Shiny Button Productions)
 Kevin Hart: Irresponsible (2019) (co-production with HartBeat Productions and 3 Arts Entertainment)
 Jack Whitehall: I'm Only Joking (2020)
 Big Age (2021)
 My Name is Leon (2022) (co-production with Douglas Road Productions, Ringside Studios, Ingenious Media, Tayox TV Limited and Vicarious)

Kudos
 Comfortably Nube (2004)
 Ladybaby (2021)

Shiny Button Productions
 Murder on the Blackpool Express (2017) (co-production with Tiger Aspect Productions)
 Dial M for Middlesbrough (2019)

Dragonfly
 The Thieving Headmasters (2006)
 Pompeii... Live! (2006) (co-production with Mentorn Media, WNET and National Geographic International)
 Pirate Ship... Live!!! (2007)
 Super Botox Me (2008)
 Cutting Edge: Ninty Naps a Day (2008)
 Terror at Sea: The Sinking of Costa Concordia (2012)
 The Sinking of the Concordia: Caught on Camera (2012)
 June Brown: Respect Your Elders (2012)
 One Born: Twins and Triplets (2012)
 Sandy: Anatomy of a Superstorm (2012)
 One Born: Plus Size Mums (2012)
 The Horsemeat Banquet (2013)
 Dinner at 11 (2014)
 Date My Mum (2016)
 Flashy Funerals (2016)
 The Boy Who Sees Upside Down (2016)
 A World Without Down's Syndrone? (2016)
 My Dad, the Peace Deal & Me (2018)
 The Science(ish) of... Stranger Things (2021)
 Leigh-Anne: Race, Pop & Power (2021)
 Patrick Kielty: One Hundred Years of Union (2021)
 Dr. Alex: Our Young Mental Health Crisis (2021)

Workerbee
 Hindus: Do We Have a Caste Problem? (2019)
 Building the World's Fastest Car (2020)
 Secrets of the Luxury Super Yachts (2020)
 Billionaire Cruise Ship: Paradise Island (2021)
 Bruno v Tyson (2021) (co-production with Sky Studios)

IWC Media
 Hire My Home (2021)
 Scotland the Rave (2021)

Electric Robin
 Homecoming: The Road to Mullingar (2022)

The Comedy Unit
 Scotland's Football Jukebox (2021)

Sidney Street
 Gok Wan's Easy Asian Christmas (2021)
 The Jubliee Pudding: 70 Years in the Baking (2022)

Zeppotron
 I Blame the Spice Girls: The Monster Quiz of the Decade (2007)
 Tapping the Wire (2007)
 Charlie Brooker's Gameswipe (2009)
 Alternative Election Special (2010)
 The Boyle Variety Performance (2012)
 How Videogames Changed the World (2013)
 8 Out of 10 Cats Does Deal or No Deal (2013)
 Frankie Boyle's Election Autopsy (2015)
 Nigel Farage Gets His Life Back (2016)

Definitely
 Gemma Collins: Self-Harm & Me (2022)

Blacklight Television
 The Queen's Sister (2005)
 The Best Man (2006)
 A Harlot's Progress (2006) (co-production with Hardy and Sons)
 Wild Decembers (2009)
 Octavia (2009)
 Joint Enterprise (2012)
 Ellen (2016)

Diverse Productions
 The Truth About Gay Animals (2002)
 Killing Hitler (2003)
 Status Anxiety (2004)
 Who Wrote the Bible (2004)
 Happy Birthday, Peter Pan (2005)
 Our Hiden Wives (2005)
 Greatest Ever Comedy Movies (2006) (co-production with Roger Grant Productions)
 Greatest Ever 80s Movies (2007) (co-production with Roger Grant Productions)
 The Secret Life of the Berlin Wall (2009)
 Samurai (2010) (as Diverse Bristol)
 Mrs Mandela (2010)

Tigress Productions
 Britain's Wild Invaders (2000)
 The Great Shark Chase (2016)
 Chris Packham: In Search of the Lost Girl (2018)
 The Great British Germ Hunt (2018)

Remarkable Television
 Your Top 20 Celebrity Big Brother Moments (2009)
 Big Brother's Big Awards Show (2010)
 Inside Chernoybl with Ben Foyle (2021)
 Don't Diet Lose Weight (2021)

Douglas Road Productions
 Lenny Henry: The Commonwealth Kid (2018) (co-production with Burning Light Productions)
 Unsung Heroines: Danielle de Niese on the Lost World of Female Composers (2018)
 The Lenny Henry Birthday Show (2018) (co-production with BBC Studios)
 My Name is Leon (2022) (co-production with Tiger Aspect Productions, Ringside Studios, Ingenious Media, Tayox TV Limited and Vicarious)
 Judi Love: Black, Female and Invisible (2022)
 Una Marson: Our Lost Caribbean Voice (2022)

Initial
 On Yer Bike for Soccer Aid (2021) (co-production with Crackit Productions)
 Lee Mack's Road to Soccer Aid (2021)

Shine TV
 100 Greatest Sexy Moments (2003)
 The 100 Greatest Musicals (2003)
 The Simpsons Quiz Show (2004)
 My Shakespeare (2004) (co-production with Penguin Television)
 The 100 Greatest Tearjerkers (2005)
 100 Greatest Cartoons (2005)
 Teenage Toutrage Camp (2006)
 100 Greatest Funny Moments (2006)
 The 100 Greatest Sex Symbols (2007)
 The Lying Game: Crimes That Fooded Britain (2014)
 The Walton Sextulpets at 30 (2014) (co-production with Ettinger Brothers)
 Bear Grylls: Surviving the Island (2014) (co-production with Bear Grylls Ventures)
 Kilimanjaro: The Bigger Red Nose Climb (2019)
 A Berry Royal Christmas (2019)
 Sports Relief: The Heat is On (2020)
 A Very British Lockdown: Diaries from the Frontline (2020)

References

Banijay
Banijay